RV8 may refer to:
 Mandala 8, the eighth mandala of the Rigveda
 MG RV8, a sports car produced by MG Cars
 Van's Aircraft RV-8, a kit aircraft
 Sonata No. 7 in C minor, RV 8, from Antonio Vivaldi's Twelve Trio Sonatas, Op. 2